Paul Flynn is an Irish sportsperson. He plays hurling with his local club Kildangan and has been a member of the Tipperary senior inter-county hurling team since 2017. He is also the brother of fellow Tipperary hurler Alan Flynn.

Career
On 5 March 2017, Flynn made his senior Tipperary debut against Clare in the 2017 National Hurling League when he came on as a second-half substitute, replacing Aidan McCormack after 56 minutes. He went on to score two points from play in a 0-21 to 0-28 win.

References

Living people
Kildangan hurlers (Tipperary)
Tipperary inter-county hurlers
Year of birth missing (living people)